In physiology and medicine, the body surface area (BSA) is the measured or calculated surface area of a human body. For many clinical purposes, BSA is a better indicator of metabolic mass than body weight because it is less affected by abnormal adipose mass. Nevertheless, there have been several important critiques of the use of BSA in determining the dosage of medications with a narrow therapeutic index, such as chemotherapy.

Typically there is a 4–10 fold variation in drug clearance between individuals due to differing the activity of drug elimination processes related to genetic and environmental factors. This can lead to significant overdosing and underdosing (and increased risk of disease recurrence). It is also thought to be a distorting factor in Phase I and II trials that may result in potentially helpful medications being prematurely rejected. The trend to personalized medicine is one approach to counter this weakness.

Uses
Examples of uses of the BSA:
 Renal clearance usually divided by the BSA i.e. per 1.73 m² to gain an appreciation of the true glomerular filtration rate (GFR);
 The Quetelet index uses a somewhat modified form of the BSA;
 The cardiac index is a measure of cardiac output divided by the BSA, giving a better approximation of the effective cardiac output;
 Chemotherapy is often dosed according to the patient's BSA.
 Glucocorticoid dosing is also expressed in terms of BSA for calculating maintenance doses or to compare high dose use with maintenance requirement.

There is some evidence that BSA values are less accurate at extremes of height and weight, where Body Mass Index may be a better estimate (for hemodynamic parameters).

Calculation
Various calculations have been published to arrive at the BSA without direct measurement. In the following formulae, BSA is expressed in m2, weight (or, more properly, mass) W in kg, and height H in cm.

The most widely used is the Du Bois formula, which has been shown to be equally as effective in estimating body fat in obese and non-obese patients, something the Body mass index fails to do.

The Mosteller formula is also commonly used, and is mathematically simpler:

Other formulas for BSA in m2 include:

{|
| Haycock || 
|-
|Gehan and George     || 
|-
|Boyd  || 
|-
|     or alternatively     || 
|-
|Fujimoto || 
|-
|Takahira || 
|-
|Shuter and Aslani || 
|-
|Lipscombe      || 
|-
|rowspan=2 | Schlich ||        (women)
|-
|       (men)
|}

For any formula, the units should match. Mosteller pointed out that his formula holds only if the density is treated as a constant for all humans. It equals .

A weight-based formula that does not include a square root (making it easier to use) was proposed by Costeff and recently validated for the pediatric age group. It is [4W (kg) + 7]/[90 + W (kg)].

Average values
Average BSA for children of various ages,  for men,  and for women, can be estimated using statistical survey data and a BSA formula:

The estimations in the above tables are based weight and height data from the U.S. NCHS National Health and Nutrition Examination Survey (2011-2014).

References

Human physiology
Area